Jaime Allison Andrews (born October 21, 1976) is an American actress, producer, business director and playwright who is known for her comedic commentary on the cable television series truTV Presents: World's Dumbest...  She has appeared in a number of television commercials over the years and was cast as Dottie in the Amazon Prime series Good Girls Revolt.

Early life and career
A native of Long Island, Andrews first began performing in local children's shows.  She appeared in her first television pilot in 2001 as part of a comedy reality series on The Nashville Network (later Spike) called Crash Test. It aired two episodes in 2004, but the program was quickly canceled.  Andrews performed regularly in live theater throughout the New York City area before moving west to Los Angeles in 2005.

After her arrival in California, Andrews became a longstanding member of Sacred Fools Theater Company. She has been part of many main-stage productions, including Goose & Tomtom, Claire Z, La Bête, The Swine Show, Forbidden Zone: Live in the 6th Dimension, Fast & Loose, Serial Killers and Absolutely Filthy (An Unauthorized Peanuts Parody).  She produced the shows The Gas House and Baal in 2007 and 2010, respectively, as well as writing and leading in Cookie & the Monster in 2015. The production won Best in Ensemble Theatre at the Hollywood Fringe Festival. Andrews has also served Sacred Fools as a business manager, 13th Season Artistic Committee member (2009-2010), and for three years as managing director. She continues to perform at theaters in her native New York from time to time.

Andrews modeled with Jamisin Matthews as the demolition couple on the DVD cover Life on the Murder Scene by rock band My Chemical Romance, which was released in 2006. She has provided comedic commentary in truTV Presents: World's Dumbest... from 2008 through 2013.

Andrews has also appeared on two episodes of Penn & Teller: Bullshit! in 2008 and 2009, as well as playing the role of Betty Bobbins in the original series of Baby Geniuses. This was released on video between 2013 and 2015. She was cast as Dottie in the Amazon Prime series Good Girls Revolt, which first aired on October 28, 2016.  The show was canceled on December 2, 2016 after one season.

Andrews will play the leading role of Andi James in an upcoming drama film called Division which she wrote. It will also star her husband, Curt Bonnem, as well as Joshua Payne.

Personal life
Andrews is married to actor and director Curt Bonnem, who was cast as Brad King in the YouTube and Hulu web television series Old Dogs & New Tricks. Bonnem appeared on an episode of Criminal Minds in 2007. He was also a member of Sacred Fools Theater Company. Andrews and Bonnem were married in June 2020. The two currently reside in Atlanta, Georgia.

Filmography and theatrical roles

Other theatrical performances done by Andrews, primarily in New York:
 The Real Thing as Debbie
 The Sisters Rosensweig as Tess Goode
 Fifteen Minutes as Linda
 Fefu & Her Friends as Cindy
 subUrbia as Erica
 'Tis Pity She's a Whore as Annabella
 Uncle Vanya as Helena
 JFK vs. the UFO's as Peaches

Andrews also had parts, including improvisational and sketches, in Campaign 2025, Ka-Baam!, Scrambled Eggs, and 600 Days of Pain.

Awards and nominations

References

External links
 
 
 Sacred Fools Theater Company

1976 births
Actresses from New York (state)
American film actresses
American stage actresses
American television actresses
Living people
21st-century American actresses
People from Long Island